Momentum is the ninth progressive rock album by Neal Morse, released in September 2012. The album features Mike Portnoy on drums, and Randy George on bass. The title track "Momentum" was released in late July 2012, along with a music video. Guests include Eric Gillette on backing vocals, along with Paul Gilbert and Adson Sodré on electric guitar.

"Thoughts" is the fifth part of a cross-album suite, with other parts being featured on the Spock's Beard albums Beware of Darkness and V. "Afterthoughts", the third part of the cycle, was released on Spock's Beard's 2013 album Brief Nocturnes and Dreamless Sleep. As of the spring of 2020, there is no official release of a fourth part of the "Thoughts" cycle.

Track listing

Personnel
Musicians
 Neal Morse – guitar, keyboards, lead vocals
 Mike Portnoy – drums
 Randy George – bass
 Rick Altizer – vocals
 Chris Carmichael – strings
 Paul Gilbert – guitar solo on "Momentum"
 Eric Gillette – vocals
 Bill Hubauer - clarinet, guitar, and keyboard solo in "World Without End"
 Wil Morse – vocals
 Adson Sodré – guitar solos on "World Without End"

Production
 Thomas Ewerhard – artwork
 Jerry Guidroz – drum engineering
 Chad Hoerner – video director
 Ken Love – mastering
 Man In the Mountain – artwork, cover art
 Neal Morse – liner notes, producer
 Rich Mouser – mixing
 Joey Pippin – band photo

Charts

References

External links
 

2012 albums
Neal Morse albums